The 1889–90 FA Cup was the 19th season of the world's oldest football knockout competition, The Football Association Challenge Cup (more usually known as the FA Cup). Blackburn Rovers won the competition for the fourth time, beating The Wednesday 6–1 in the final at Kennington Oval. The match total of seven goals remains the record (equalled in the 1953 final) for the highest number of goals scored in an FA Cup final. Blackburn's own score of six goals remains the record (equalled by Bury in 1903 and by Manchester City in 2019) for the most by one team in an FA Cup final.

Qualifying rounds
For information on the matches played from the First Round Qualifying to the Fourth Round Qualifying, see 1889–90 FA Cup qualifying rounds.

First Round Proper

Replays

Second Round Proper

Third Round Proper

Replays

Semi-finals

Final

References
 FA Cup Results Archive

 
FA Cup seasons
FA Cup
FA